Michaela Caspar (born 1960) is a German actress.

Selected filmography
 Last Stop Toyland (2009) as Rektorin
 The Grand Budapest Hotel (2014) as Marguerite
 Hitman: Agent 47 (2015) as the Hall of Records Clerk

Selected television
 In aller Freundschaft (2000) as Linda Jakubeit (Episode: "Zwischen zwei Leben")
 Der Fahnder (2000)
 In aller Freundschaft (2003) as Iris Heine (Episode: "Isoliert")
 Leipzig Homicide (2003) as Frau Brockwitz (Episode: "Benni und die Detektive")
 Leipzig Homicide (2010) as Ruth Böttcher (Episode: "Der Aufstand")
 Stromberg (2011–2012) as Frau Papenacker (4 episodes)
 Tatort (2011) as Martina Kästner (Episode: "Schwarze Tiger, weiße Löwen")
 Tatort (2015) as Simone Mendt (Episode: "Preis des Lebens")
 Deutschland 83 (2015) as Frau Netz
 Tatort (2016) as Birgit Meggle (Episode: "Fünf Minuten Himmel")
 Bella Block (2018) as Frau Paslak (Episode: "Stille Wasser")
 Deutschland 86 (2018) as Frau Netz

References

External links
 

1960 births
Living people
German film actresses
German television actresses